The Bench is a 2000 Danish drama film directed by Per Fly.

Synopsis 
An unemployed drunk hangs out at a public bench in the town centre with a group of like-minded souls, with no interests other than finding the money for the next drink. When a single mother moves into a neighbouring apartment he becomes involved in her troubles.

Cast 
 Jesper Christensen – Kaj
 Marius Sonne Janischefska – Jonas
 Stine Holm Joensen – Liv
 Nicolaj Kopernikus – Stig
 Jens Albinus – Kim
 Sarah Boberg – Connie
 Benjamin Boe Rasmussen – Bo
 Holger Perfort – Pensionist

Awards 
 Bodil Award for Best Danish Film (2000)
 Robert Award for Best Danish Film (2000)

References

External links 
 
 

2000 films
2000 drama films
2000s Danish-language films
Best Danish Film Bodil Award winners
Best Danish Film Robert Award winners
Danish drama films
Films directed by Per Fly
Zentropa films